Praealticus triangulus, the triangle-crest rockskipper is a species of combtooth blenny found in the eastern Indian ocean, around the Andaman Islands.

References

triangulus
Taxa named by Wilbert McLeod Chapman
Fish described in 1951